Roy Terwilliger (born June 20, 1937) is an American politician in the state of Minnesota. He served in the Minnesota State Senate.

References

Minnesota state  senators
Minnesota Republicans
1937 births
Living people
People from Edina, Minnesota